Wlodek Rabinowicz (Włodzimierz Rabinowicz, born on 14 January 1947) is a Polish-Swedish philosopher and Professor Emeritus at Lund University. Rabinowicz's areas of expertise include ethics, normativity, decision theory and utilitarianism. From 1995 to 1998, he was editor-in-chief of Theoria.

Biography
He began his undergraduate studies at the University of Warsaw, but after the 1968 Polish political crisis he moved to the University of Uppsala, where he graduated in 1970. He received his doctorate in 1979.

Bibliography 
Universalizability. A study in morals and metaphysics, D.Reidel Publ. Comp., Dordrecht 1979.
Logic for a Change, Festschrift for Sten Lindström, redakcja, wraz z Svenem Ove Hanssonem, Uppsala Prints and Preprints in Philosophy 1995.
Preference and Value - Preferentialism in Ethics, redakcja, Studies in Philosophy, Lund 1996.
Value and Choice – Some Common Themes in Decision Theory and Moral Philosophy, redaktor, Lund Philosophy Reports 2000:1
Value and Choice – Some Common Themes in Decision Theory and Moral Philosophy, vol. 2, redaktor, Lund Philosophy Reports 2001:1.
Patterns of Value – Essays on Formal Axiology and Value Analysis, vol. 2, redaktor, wraz z Toni Rønnow-Rasmussenem, Lund Philosophy Reports 2004:1,

References

External links
  Wlodek Rabinowicz's profile at the website of Lund University
  W. Rabinowicz's CV
 Hommage à Wlodek. Philosophical Papers Dedicated to Wlodek Rabinowicz, ed. Toni Rønnow-Rasmussen, Björn Petersson, Jonas Josefsson & Dan Egonsson, 2007.

1947 births
Living people
Members of the Royal Swedish Academy of Sciences
Analytic philosophers
Utilitarians
20th-century Polish philosophers
21st-century Swedish philosophers
Writers from Warsaw
Polish emigrants to Sweden
Academic staff of Lund University